The 41st World Science Fiction Convention (Worldcon), also known as ConStellation, was held on 1–5 September 1983 at the Baltimore Convention Center in Baltimore, Maryland, United States.

The chairman was Michael J. Walsh.

Participants 

Attendance was approximately 7,000.

Guests of Honor 

 John Brunner (pro)
 David A. Kyle (fan)
 Jack L. Chalker (toastmaster)

Other notable participants 

As part of the promotion for the film The Right Stuff, test pilot Chuck Yeager, astronaut Gordon Cooper, plus actors Veronica Cartwright, Scott Glenn, and Dennis Quaid appeared at the convention.

Awards

1983 Hugo Awards 

 Best Novel: Foundation's Edge by Isaac Asimov
 Best Novella: "Souls" by Joanna Russ
 Best Novelette: "Fire Watch" by Connie Willis
 Best Short Story: "Melancholy Elephants" by Spider Robinson
 Best Non-Fiction Book: Isaac Asimov: The Foundations of Science Fiction by James E. Gunn
 Best Dramatic Presentation: Blade Runner
 Best Professional Editor: Edward L. Ferman
 Best Professional Artist: Michael Whelan
 Best Fanzine: Locus, edited by Charles N. Brown
 Best Fan Writer: Richard E. Geis
 Best Fan Artist: Alexis Gilliland

Other awards 

 John W. Campbell Award for Best New Writer: Paul O. Williams

See also 

 Hugo Award
 Science fiction
 Speculative fiction
 World Science Fiction Society
 Worldcon

References

External links 

 NESFA.org: The Long List
 NESFA.org: 1983 convention notes 

1983 conferences
1983 in Maryland
Conventions in Baltimore
Conventions in Maryland
Science fiction conventions in the United States
Worldcon